There is one Institute of National Importance, one central university and four private universities offering courses in the Indian state of Sikkim.

Universities

Institutes of National Importance

Central universities

State universities

Private universities

References

Sikkim
Education
Universities and colleges in Sikkim